Ronald Barri Flowers is an American writer of mystery novels and non-fiction books, as well as a criminologist. He lives in Honolulu, Hawaii.

Early life and education
Flowers was born the second of five children in Michigan. He attended Mumford High School on the northwest side of Detroit. He graduated from Michigan State University with a bachelor of arts degree in 1977 and a masters of science in 1980, both in criminal justice. In 2006, he was inducted into the MSU Criminal Justice Wall of Fame.

Career 

In 2004, after previously writing non-fiction books and short stories, Flowers wrote his first legal thriller, Persuasive Evidence.

He has written 12 romance novels under the pseudonym "Devon Vaughn Archer" and was the first male author for Harlequin's Arabesque imprint. Midwest Book Review described Kissing the Girl Next Door, a title in the series, as romance that "flows off the page."

Flowers' short story, "The Wrong End of A Gun Barrel," was included in author Curt Colbert's Seattle Noir. It was released in spring 2009 as a part of Akashic Books' noir series.

He has edited two mystery and one true-crime anthology, including Masters of True Crime, released by Prometheus Books in July 2012. He also writes short stories and collections.

He appeared on Investigation Discovery's "Wicked Attraction" series in an episode titled "Twisted Twosome." Flowers also appeared in A&E's 2008 Biography Channel crime series episode "The Love Slave Murders" about the Gerald and Charlene Gallego case depicted in his true crime book The Sex Slave Murders, an excerpt of which was printed in the February 1997 issue of Cosmopolitan magazine. It was also included in Suspense Magazine'''s Best of 2011 books.

Flowers was profiled in a Q&A article on Yahoo! Voices in May 2012.

 Awards 

His 2005 book, Justice Served, was nominated for a Romantic Times Award.

Books

True crimeThe Sex Slave Murders (1996, 2012)Murders in the United States (Sept 2004)Mass Murder in the Sky (Feb 2012) (eBook edition)Serial Killer Couples (April 2012)The Pickaxe Slave Killers (April 2013)
 Murder at the Pencil Factory (May 2013)
 The Sex Slave Murders 2  (July 2013)
 Dead at the Saddleworth Moor (July 2013)
 Killers of the Lonely Hearts (Aug 2013)
 Murder of a Star Quarterback (Sept 2013)
 Murder Chronicles (November 2014)

CriminologyChildren and Criminality (Nov 1986)Women and Criminality (June 1987)Demographics and Criminality (Dec 1989)Minorities and Criminality (Feb 1990)Criminal Jurisdiction Allocation in Indian Country (Feb 1990)The Victimization and Exploitation of Women and Children (Oct 1994)Domestic Crimes, Family Violence and Child Abuse (July 2000)Runaway Kids and Teenage Prostitution (June 2001)Kids Who Commit Adult Crimes (July 2002)Murder, at the End of the Day and Night (Aug 2002)The Prostitution of Women and Girls (Aug 2005)Sex Crimes (Oct 2006)Female Crimes, Criminals and Cellmates (Dec 2008)Drugs, Alcohol and Criminality in American Society (Feb 2008)The Adolescent Criminal (Dec 2008)College Crime (Oct 2009)Street Kids (April 2010)Prostitution in the Digital Age (April 2011)The Dynamics of Murder (Nov 2012)

ThrillersPersuasive Evidence (Oct 2004)Justice Served (Aug 2005)State's Evidence (Apr 2006)Dead in the Rose City (Nov 2010)Dark Streets of Whitechapel (Feb 2012) (e-book and audio releases)Murder in Maui: A Leila Kahana Mystery (April 2012)Murder in Honolulu: A Skye Delaney Mystery (June 2012)Killer in the Woods (July 2012) (e-book edition)Seduced to Kill in Kauai (Nov 2012)Before He Kills Again (April 2013) Fractured Trust (Mar 2014)

Young adult fictionGhost Girl in Shadow Bay (Jan 2011)Danger in Time (Jan 2011)Christmas Wishes: Laura's Story (Nov 2012)Count Dracula's Teenage Daughter (Dec 2012)Teen Ghost at Dead Lake (Sept 2013)Out for Blood (Nov 2013)

Young adult fiction (under pseudonym)Her Teen Dream (Nov 2011)Her Teen Dream: Summer Heartbreak (April 2012)His Teen Dream (Oct 2012)

Romance novelsForever Sweethearts (Nov 2012) (e-book edition)

Under pseudonymLove Once Again (2006)Christmas Heat (2007)Destined to Meet (2008)Kissing the Man Next Door (2009)The Secrets of Paradise Bay (2010)The Hitman's Woman (2011)Private Luau (2011)Pleasure in Hawaii  (2011)Aloha Fantasy (April 2012)Danger at Every Turn (2012)Love is in The Air (2013)Say It With Roses (2013)Bet on Love (Jan 2014)

AnthologiesMurder Past, Murder Present (Sept 2009)Murder Here, Murder There (May 2012)Masters of True Crime'' (July 2012)

References

External links 
Author's official site
Mystery Writers of America profile

MSU Alumni Buzz - R. Barri Flowers: Master of True Crime
The Independent Author Network

American criminologists
American thriller writers
American romantic fiction writers
American non-fiction crime writers
Writers from Detroit
Novelists from Hawaii
Living people
20th-century American novelists
21st-century American novelists
American male novelists
20th-century American male writers
21st-century American male writers
Novelists from Michigan
20th-century American non-fiction writers
21st-century American non-fiction writers
American male non-fiction writers
Mumford High School alumni
1956 births